Powellisetia pelseneeri is a species of minute sea snail, a marine gastropod mollusk or micromollusk in the family Rissoidae.

They are detritivores and reproduce sexually.

References

Rissoidae
Gastropods described in 1912